The 2016 Maldives FA Cup Final was the 28th Final of the Maldives FA Cup.

Route to the final

Match

Details

See also
2016 Maldives FA Cup

References

Pre match talks by TC - Mihaaru Sports
Pre match talks by Valencia - Mihaaru Sports
Post match talks by Valencia - Mihaaru Sports

Maldives FA Cup finals
FA Cup